Antônio Carlos Valadares (born April 6, 1943) is a Brazilian politician. He has represented Sergipe in the Federal Senate since 1995. Previously he was the Governor of Sergipe from 1987 to 1991 and a Deputy from Sergipe from 1979 to 1983. He is a member of the Brazilian Socialist Party.

References

Living people
1943 births
Members of the Federal Senate (Brazil)
Members of the Chamber of Deputies (Brazil) from Sergipe
Brazilian Socialist Party politicians
Governors of Sergipe